Hemidactylus adensis is a species of house gecko from Yemen.

References

Further reading
 

Hemidactylus
Reptiles described in 2015
Reptiles of the Middle East
Endemic fauna of Yemen